In group theory, a discipline within modern algebra, an element  of a group  is called a real element of  if it belongs to the same conjugacy class as its inverse , that is, if there is a  in  with , where  is defined as .

A group with every element real is called an ambivalent group. Every ambivalent group has a real character table. The symmetric group  of any degree  is ambivalent.

Properties 
A group with real elements other than the identity element necessarily is of even order.

.

Every involution is strongly real. Furthermore, every element that is the product of two involutions is strongly real. Conversely, every strongly real element is the product of two involutions.

Extended centralizer 
The extended centralizer of an element  of a group  is defined as

making the extended centralizer of an element  equal to the normalizer of the set 

For involutions or non-real elements, centralizer and extended centralizer are equal. For a real element  of a group  that is not an involution,

See also
 Brauer–Fowler theorem

Notes

References
 
 
 

Group theory